Ghanari is the headquarter of Tehsil Ghanari in Una district of Himachal Pradesh, India. It comes under Gagret vidhan sabha constituency and shares border with Punjab and lies on the bank of the seasonal Swan River. It is situated in plains of District Una.

Origin of name Ghanari lies in two Sanskrit words Ghan(घन) which means clouds and ari(अरी) which means enemy. It is said that a lot of times in past it used to rain in all surrounding places but not in Ghanari. Thats why this place was named Ghanari(Ghan + Ari).

People 
The local language is primarily Punjabi while Hindi and English are used in official purpose. The population of Ghanari is around 4500. Most of people of Ghanari belong to the Education Department, explaining Ghanari's fame for its teachers.

Ghanari has given many soldiers and officers to Indian Armed Forces including a winner of sword of honour at Indian Military Academy.

Climatic conditions 
In summer, Ghanari's temperature reaches up to 46-47 degree and in winters it falls to -2 degree.

Education 

In 2011, literacy rate of Ghanari was 91.56% compared to 82.80% of Himachal Pradesh. Male literacy stands at 97.00% while female literacy rate was 86.43%.

References 

Villages in Una district